This is a list of silver mines in alphabetical order and includes both operating and closed mines.

Africa

Tanzania

Dr Congo

Guinea Bissau

Asia

Australia
Golden Grove Mine
McArthur River zinc mine
Mount Isa Mines
Mount Morgan Mine
Prominent Hill Mine

Europe

Germany
Glasebach Pit
Samson Pit

Greece
Saiderocaus

Norway
Kongsberg Silver Mines

Poland
Historic Silver Mine in Tarnowskie Góry

Sweden
Nasa silver mine
Sala Silver Mine

United Kingdom
Combe Martin Silver mine

Finland

• Sotkamo Silver

North America

Canada
Barton Mine
Beanland Mine
Big Dan Mine
Blue Hawk Mine
Buffalo Mine
Coniagas Mine
Copperfields Mine
Hudson Bay Mine
Keeley-Frontier Mine
Murray Brook Mine
Nipissing Mine
Nova Scotia Mine
Priest Mine
Sullivan Mine
Temagami-Lorrain Mine
Trethewey Mine

Mexico
Mina Proaño
Naica Mine
Noche Buena mine
Pitarrilla mine
Tayopa

United States
Cerro Colorado Mine
Cliff mine
Commonwealth Mine
Emma Silver Mine
Hercules silver mine
Homestake Mine
Independence mine
Iron Mountain Mine
Minesota Mine
Montana mine
Sherman Mine
Silver King Mine
Sunshine Mine
Sweet Home Mine
Swift's silver mine

South America

Argentina
Cerro Vanguardia Mine

Bolivia
San Bartolomé mine

Brazil
Morro Velho

Peru
Santa Ana mine

See also
 List of countries by silver production

Silver mines